Vladimir Volegov (born in Khabarovsk, 1957) is a visual artist from Russia who lives in Spain. His early work centered on graphic art for music recordings, comics, and commercial posters. He is known in the West for his oil paintings, which often depict outdoor family life scenes.

Career

Volegov graduated in 1986 from the Lvov Institute of Printing Art. He then began his career in Moscow as a graphic artist working in the music-record, comics, and advertising industries.

From 1986, Volegov lived in Western Europe as a street painter while developing his realistic style, often representing feminine beauty, maternity and childhood in "romantic" settings. Volegov in 2015 participated as an invited artist at the anniversary exhibition of the Waterhouse Gallery in Santa Barbara, California.

References

External links
 Artist's website

Living people
Russian painters
Russian male painters
Russian contemporary artists
1957 births